Antoine Vézina is a Québécois actor.

Career
A 2000 alumnus of the Université du Québec à Montréal with a bachelor's degree in theatre, Vézina has a strong improvisational theatre background, having performed in the Quebec improvisational leagues the Ligue universitaire d'improvisation (LUI, league of Université Laval), the Ligue d'improvisation centrale de l'UQAM (LicUQAM, league of the Université du Québec à Montréal), the Cravates, the Ligue d'improvisation Globale, the Limonade, the Ligue d'improvisation montréalaise (LIM) and the reputed Ligue nationale d'improvisation (LNI). He is also a member of the improvisational troupe Cinplass.

Vézina was part of the winning team of the international improv competition the Mondial d'Impro in Strasbourg, France. In conventional theatre, he played in 2005 the role of Don Bazile in The Barber of Seville. He was cast for the lead character in the television show La Job, a Quebec adaptation of the British The Office. He was seen in a number of television advertising campaigns like those of the Fédération des producteurs de lait du Québec, Chrysler Jeep-Dodge and the Yellow Pages.

Filmography

Films 
Les Boys IV (2005)
Ce n'était qu'un rêve (2004)
Aline (2021)

Television 
Ceci N'est Pas Un Talk-show (2019)
Med (2016)
La Job (2006)
Les Ex (2005)
Casting (2005)
Caméra Café (2004, guest star)
L'Odyssée de l'espèce (2003)
Annie et ses hommes (2002)
Jean Duceppe (2002)
Lance et Compte: La nouvelle génération (2002)
Rumeurs (2002)

See also 
List of Quebec actors
Ligue nationale d'improvisation
Television of Quebec
Culture of Quebec

External links

Year of birth missing (living people)
Living people
Canadian male film actors
Canadian male television actors
French Quebecers
Male actors from Quebec
Université du Québec à Montréal alumni